Mount Paul is a  mountain summit towering 1134 metres above the east shore of Maligne Lake in Jasper National Park, in the Canadian Rockies of Alberta, Canada. The nearest higher peak is Maligne Mountain,  to the north-northwest. Mount Paul is situated north of Monkhead and they are often seen together in the background of iconic calendar photos of Spirit Island and Maligne Lake.


History

Mount Paul was named by Mary Schäffer after Paul Sharples, Mary's nine year old nephew who accompanied her on her second expedition to Maligne Lake in 1911. Mary originally referred to this mountain as The Thumb during her first successful expedition to Maligne Lake in 1908.

The first ascent of Mount Paul was made in 1928 by W.R. Hainsworth and M.M. Strumia This mountain's name was officially adopted in 1946 by the Geographical Names Board of Canada.

Climate

Based on the Köppen climate classification, Mount Paul is located in a subarctic climate with cold, snowy winters, and mild summers. Temperatures can drop below −20 °C with wind chill factors below −30 °C. Precipitation runoff from Mount Paul drains west into Maligne Lake, thence into the Maligne River which is a tributary of the Athabasca River.

See also
List of mountains of Canada

References

External links
 Parks Canada web site: Jasper National Park
 Mount Paul weather: Mountain Forecast

Paul
Mountains of Jasper National Park
Canadian Rockies
Alberta's Rockies